Kisi Pulu (born 31 January 1979, in Leimatu'a, Tonga) is a rugby union footballer. His usual position is at prop. He currently plays for USA Perpignan in the Top 14 in France. He also plays for Tonga.

References

 lequipe.fr profile

1979 births
Living people
Rugby union props
Tongan rugby union players
Tonga international rugby union players
Pacific Islanders rugby union players
Tongan expatriate rugby union players
Expatriate rugby union players in France
Expatriate rugby union players in England
Tongan expatriate sportspeople in France
Tongan expatriate sportspeople in England
People from Vavaʻu
SC Albi players
Stade Toulousain players
USA Perpignan players